The 1991 SunBank 24 at Daytona was a 24-hour endurance sports car race held on February 2–3, 1991 at the Daytona International Speedway road course. The race served as the opening round of the 1991 IMSA GT Championship.

Victory overall and in the GTP class went to the No. 7 Joest Racing Porsche 962 driven by Frank Jelinski, Henri Pescarolo, Hurley Haywood, Bob Wollek and "John Winter". Victory in the LM class went to the No. 83 Nissan Performance Technology Nissan R90CK driven by Bob Earl, Derek Daly, Chip Robinson, and Geoff Brabham. Victory in the GTP Lights class went to the No. 48 Acura Spice SE90P driven by Parker Johnstone, Steve Cameron, Doug Peterson, and Bob Lesnett. The GTO class was won by the No. 15 Whistler Mustang Ford Mustang driven by Mark Martin, Wally Dallenbach Jr., and Robby Gordon. Finally, the GTU class was won by the No. 82 Greer Racing Mazda RX-7 driven by Dick Greer, Al Bacon, Mike Mees, and Peter Uria.

Race results
Class winners in bold.

References

External links
 daytonainternationalspeedway.com

24 Hours of Daytona
1991 in sports in Florida
1991 in American motorsport